Pleasant Valley is an unincorporated community located within Hopewell Township in Mercer County, New Jersey. The Howell Living History Farm, also known as the Joseph Phillips Farm, is located in the community.

History
The community is located along the northern edge of a  plot bought by the governor of West Jersey, Daniel Coxe, in 1685. Joseph Phillips started his farm in 1732, and sold  to blacksmith John Phillips in 1737.

Historic district

The Pleasant Valley Historic District is a  historic district located along Pleasant Valley Road, Valley Road, Woodens Lane and Hunter Road in the community, and extending into West Amwell Township in Hunterdon County. The district was added to the National Register of Historic Places on June 14, 1991, for its significance in agriculture, architecture, and exploration/settlement. It includes 52 contributing buildings, 7 contributing structures, and 22 contributing sites. The individually listed Howell Living History Farm is central to the district.

See also
 National Register of Historic Places listings in Hunterdon County, New Jersey
 National Register of Historic Places listings in Mercer County, New Jersey

References

Hopewell Township, Mercer County, New Jersey
Unincorporated communities in Mercer County, New Jersey
Unincorporated communities in New Jersey
National Register of Historic Places in Hunterdon County, New Jersey
National Register of Historic Places in Mercer County, New Jersey
Historic districts on the National Register of Historic Places in New Jersey
New Jersey Register of Historic Places